Paekakariki Press is an independent publishing house and letterpress workshop, founded in 2010 and based in Walthamstow, London.

About 
The proprietor of Paekariki Press is Matthew Arthur Mckenzie, a native of New Zealand.  The company makes use of a variety of different printing tools that date from between the nineteenth and early-twentieth century. The books are typeset using the Press's own Monotype Composition Caster, printed on a Heidelberg KS Cylinder and bound by hand. So far, all their publications have been of poetry.

They have published over 40 titles including works by several internationally prominent poets, including Ivy Alvarez, Alan Loney and George Szirtes. In at least one instance, the company has raised funds for the publication of a book using the crowdfunding platform Kickstarter.

In addition to publishing handmade books, the company also offers letterpress workshops and other similar activities to the public.

Equipment 
Being committed to traditional methods of production, the Press has also become a repository of old printing equipment. The major items are listed here:
Type and casting equipment
Over 300 cases of metal type
Monotype Composition Caster
Monotype Super Caster
Ludlow type L Linecaster
Presses
 Heidelberg KS Cylinder
AutoVic parallel approach platen
Thompson Automatic platen
Model 3 treadle platen
Hopkinson & Cope Albion
As well as printing and publishing books, Paekakariki Press uses its large collection of Monotype Composition matrices to cast type commercially, being one of the handful of companies remaining in the UK to offer such a service.

Notes 

British printers
English printers
Companies based in the London Borough of Waltham Forest
Book publishing companies of the United Kingdom
British companies established in 2010